John Bower (1940–2017) was an American skier.

John Bower may also refer to:

John Dykes Bower (1905–1981), English cathedral organist
John Oates Bower (1901–1981), Canadian politician, businessman and executive
John W. Bower (1800–1850), Texas settler and signatory to the Texas Declaration of Independence
John Bower (MP for Penryn), English politician

See also

John Bauer (disambiguation) 
John Bowyer (disambiguation)
John Bowers (disambiguation)